Lane Allen Evans (August 4, 1951 – November 5, 2014) was an American attorney and politician who served as a Democratic member of the United States House of Representatives from 1983 until 2007, representing the 17th District of Illinois. Evans announced that he would not seek reelection in November 2006 and retired at the end of the 109th Congress, due to the increasingly debilitating effects of Parkinson's disease.

Background

Evans was born in 1951 in Rock Island, Illinois, and attended Alleman High School and Augustana College there. He served in the United States Marine Corps during the Vietnam War, stationed in Okinawa. After leaving the Marines in 1971, Evans enrolled at Augustana College in Rock Island, graduating in 1974. He earned a Juris Doctor degree from Georgetown University in 1977 and he started his legal career as an attorney with the Quad Cities Legal Clinic [Mid America Law Offices, Ltd.] in Moline.

In 1982, Evans ran for and won the Democratic nomination for Illinois's 17th congressional district, which included most of Illinois' share of the Quad Cities area.  It had been renumbered from the 19th District since Illinois lost two districts after the 1980 census. The district had been in Republican hands for all but two years since 1939. However, the brand of Republicanism that prevailed in the district had traditionally been a moderate one. Evans got a significant boost when 16-year incumbent Tom Railsback was defeated for renomination by the more conservative Republican, State Senator Kenneth McMillan. Taking advantage of hardships from that year's recession, Evans won by around 5 percentage points. Evans earned the highest opposition (90%) to President Reagan's agenda of any congress member during his first congressional session and  then handily defeated McMillan in a 1984 rematch. Despite Ronald Reagan's gigantic 1984 landslide victory that year, Evans pulled in 57% to Reagan's 54% -besting the president by more than 5,000 votes in the 17th Congressional District. This was one of the few congressional districts where Reagan's percentage in the two-way was lower than the three-way in 1980.

Evans faced opposition in his next four campaigns, and beat his republican 1990 opponent by more than 50,000 votes with 67% of the vote.  In 1994, Republicans retook the House, yet Evans held his seat and won by nine points over a little-known Republican, Jim Anderson, who spent almost no money. This emboldened the Republicans for 1996, when Evans faced Mark Baker, an anchor at WGEM-TV in Quincy (the third-largest city in the district). Presidential candidate Bill Clinton carried the district by a healthy 30,000 votes, and Evans defeated Baker by 11,000 votes. A 1998 rematch was closer, with Evans only winning by 6,000 votes. A third run by Baker in 2000 saw Evans win by 10 points. Redistricting after the 2000 census made Evans safer. Decatur and part of Springfield were added while some more rural areas were taken out. The redistricting process, guided by House Speaker and 14th District Congressman Dennis Hastert and 3rd District Congressman Bill Lipinski, solidified the holdings of many Illinois incumbents. Evans was re-elected in 2002 and 2004.

Evans is credited with passage of the Agent Orange Act of 1991 which he sponsored. In 1995 he was awarded the Silver Helmet award from American Veterans Group (AMVETS). Evans was also instrumental in the election of Barack Obama during the 2004 United States Senate election in Illinois.

Beginning in 1995, Evans battled Parkinson's disease. While his previous opponents did not make an issue of it, his 2004 opponent, Andrea Zinga (a former anchorwoman at KWQC-TV and WQAD-TV in the Quad Cities) claimed he was not able to fully represent the members of his district due to his health concerns. However, this tactic backfired, and Evans won handily. During his tenure, Evans was one of the most liberal members of the House, and probably Illinois' most liberal congressman from outside Chicago. A founding member of the Congressional Progressive Caucus, and the House Populist Caucus  he had a near-perfect lifetime rating from Americans for Democratic Action, while the American Conservative Union gave him its lowest rating of any congressman outside Chicago. 

Evans was one of 31 Democrats in the House of Representatives to vote to reject Ohio's 20 electoral votes in the 2004 Presidential Election, despite Republican President George Bush winning the state by 118,457 votes.

In 2019 his biography "Guts: The Lane Evans Story" was published by Strong Arm Press, authored by Devin Hansen.

FEC actions
On June 27, 2005, Evans' campaign committee agreed to pay $185,000 to settle an investigation by the Federal Election Commission. The inquiry stemmed from allegations of illegal coordination between the 17th District Victory Fund, the Rock Island Democratic Central Committee and the congressman's campaign during the 1998 and 2000 election cycles.  According to the FEC press release:

The Rock Island Democratic Central Committee, for its part, agreed to a civil penalty of $30,000.

Retirement and death
Evans won the Democratic primary in 2006 and was poised for a rematch against Zinga. On March 28, 2006, however, Evans announced that he would not stand for a 13th term in November 2006. He made a brief return to Washington in June 2006. His withdrawal from the general election left local Democrats with the task of finding a replacement candidate. Their choice was Congressman Evans' district director, Phil Hare, who was elected. 
On November 5, 2014, Evans died at the age of 63 in a nursing home in East Moline, Illinois, from complications brought on by Parkinson's disease.

Electoral history

Election of November 2, 1982
D. Lane Evans — 94,483 53%
R. Kenneth McMillan — 84,347 47%
Election of November 6, 1984
D. Lane Evans — 128,273 57%
R. Kenneth McMillan — 98,069 43%
Election of November 4, 1986
D. Lane Evans — 85,442 56%
R. Sam McHard — 68,101 44%
Election of November 8, 1988
D. Lane Evans — 132,130 65%
R. William E. Stewart — 71,560 35%
Election of November 6, 1990
D. Lane Evans — 102,062 67%
R. Dan Lee — 51,380 33%
Election of November 3, 1992
D. Lane Evans — 156,233 60%
R. Kenneth Schloemer — 103,719 40%
Election of November 8, 1994
D. Lane Evans — 95,312 55%
R. Jim Anderson — 79,471 45%
Election of November 5, 1996
D. Lane Evans — 120,008 52%
R. Mark W. Baker — 109,240 47%
L. William J. Herrman — 1,925 1%
Election of November 3, 1998
D. Lane Evans — 100,128 52%
R. Mark W. Baker — 94,072 48%
Election of November 7, 2000
D. Lane Evans — 132,494 55%
R. Mark W. Baker — 108,853 45%
Election of November 5, 2002
D. Lane Evans — 127,093 62%
R. Peter Calderone — 76,519 38%
Election of November 2, 2004
D. Lane Evans — 172,320 61%
R. Andrea Zinga — 111,680 39%

See also

21st Century Democrats — political party organization co-founded by Evans

References

External links

2004 campaign finance data
record maintained by the Washington Post

|-

1951 births
2014 deaths
American people of Welsh descent
Illinois lawyers
Augustana College (Illinois) alumni
United States Marines
Georgetown University Law Center alumni
Neurological disease deaths in Illinois
Deaths from Parkinson's disease
Democratic Party members of the United States House of Representatives from Illinois
Politicians from Rock Island, Illinois
Military personnel from Illinois
20th-century American politicians
21st-century American politicians
20th-century American lawyers